The 2012–13 season was Edinburgh Rugby's twelfth season competing in the Pro12.

Squad List

Heineken Cup

Transfers 2012/2013

Players in
  John Yapp from  Cardiff Blues
  W. P. Nel from  Cheetahs
  Izak van der Westhuizen from  Cheetahs
  Perry-John Parker from  Esher
  Dimitri Basilaia from  Valence d’Agen
  Richie Rees from  Cardiff Blues
  Greig Tonks from  Northampton
  Ben Atiga from  Otago
  Mike Penn from  Nottingham

Players out
  Kyle Traynor
  Andrew Kelly
  Jack Gilding
  Esteban Lozada to  Agen
  Alan MacDonald
  Mike Blair to  Brive
  Phil Godman to  London Scottish
  Jim Thompson to  London Scottish
  Chris Paterson Retired

References 

2012–13 in Scottish rugby union
2012-13
2012–13 Pro12 by team
2012–13 Heineken Cup by team